Sidney Municipal Airport  is a village owned, public use airport located one nautical mile (2 km) west of Sidney, a village in the Town of Sidney, Delaware County, New York, United States. It is included in the National Plan of Integrated Airport Systems for 2011–2015, which categorized it as a general aviation facility.

Facilities and aircraft 
Sidney Municipal Airport covers an area of 50 acres (20 ha) at an elevation of 1,026 feet (313 m) above mean sea level. It has one runway designated 7/25 with an asphalt surface measuring 4,201 by 75 feet (1,280 × 23 m).

For the 12-month period ending June 16, 2011, the airport had 7,800 aircraft operations, an average of 21 per day: 90% general aviation and 10% air taxi. At that time there were 27 aircraft based at this airport: 78% single-engine, 11% jet, 7% multi-engine, and 4% helicopter.

References

External links 
 Sidney Municipal Airport (N23) at NYSDOT Airport Directory
 Aerial image as of May 1997 from USGS The National Map
 
 

Airports in New York (state)
Transportation in Delaware County, New York